Geoffrey Giuliano (born September 11, 1953) is an American author, radio personality, and film actor, best known for his  biographies of the Beatles members John Lennon, Paul McCartney, and George Harrison, and of musician Pete Townshend. He is also known for his involvement in the McLibel case. In 2021 he garnered international attention by appearing in the role of VIP four in Netflix's series Squid Game.

Biography

Giuliano was born in Rochester, New York and raised in the villages of Albion and Olcott Beach, New York. He was the youngest of five children. His father, Joseph Robert Juliana, was a heating contractor. He and his mother, Myrna Oneita Juliana, moved to Tampa, Florida when he was 12. There, he first became interested in acting, Vedic philosophy and fine art seriography.

He was born "Jeffrey Joseph Juliana", but later adopted "Geoffrey Giuliano" as a pen name. In 1997, he changed his legal name to "Jagannatha Dasa". For a brief period, the honorific title of "Puripada" was awarded him by several Indian yoga students, but Giuliano ultimately rejected the title as inappropriate.

Giuliano attended Madison Junior High School, H.B. Plant High School and Hillsborough Community College (all in Tampa). In the mid-1970s, he graduated from the State University of New York at Brockport and began working as an actor.

Literary work
Giuliano has written extensively on popular music, particularly the Beatles. By 1999, he had authored 20 books, including Dark Horse: The Private Life of George Harrison (1990) and Blackbird: The Life and Times of Paul McCartney (1991). Rolling Stone magazine described Dark Horse as "evenhanded and soundly researched", while Barry Miller of Library Journal said it was "a revelatory biography of the elusive Harrison and his constellation of secular and spiritual interests, passions, pursuits, friends, and loves ... Harrison's own autobiographical I, Me, Mine is unsurpassed for the song-by-song explication, but Dark Horse should be its on-shelf companion."

In an interview for The Guardian in September 1992, Giuliano offended George Harrison's wife Olivia by referring to the Beatles as "real shits in real life" and dismissing Paul McCartney as "just shallow and vacuous". On October 5 that year, The Guardian published a letter from Olivia Harrison in which she wrote that "like a starving dog he [Giuliano] scavenges his heroes, picking up bits of gristle and sinew along the way." She also complained about Giuliano's use of a quote by Harrison on the cover of Dark Horse, saying: "My husband once made the remark: 'That guy knows more about my life than I do.' Giuliano missed the joke and used it to endorse his book." When interviewed in Los Angeles on December 14, 1992, Harrison said of Giuliano: "Yeah, I met him briefly. I have no way of recalling what year it was. I met him at the home of "Legs" Larry Smith for possibly thirty minutes."

Giuliano's Pete Townshend biography, Behind Blue Eyes, was published in 1996 by Dutton Books. A reviewer for Publishers Weekly said that Giuliano "peels away the layers of Townshend's public persona to find a complex, passionate man who is full of contradictions" and described the book as a "penetrating look" at the musician's life. Booklist commented that Behind Blue Eyes covered the subject's rock-star excesses, his spiritual preoccupations, and "lots of overintellectualizing about rock", adding: "In other words, this is the perfect Pete Townshend bio."

Giuliano's biography of John Lennon, Lennon in America: 1971–1980 (Cooper Square Press, 2000), was controversial. Giuliano said the book was based in part on transcripts of Lennon's diaries given to him by the late American singer Harry Nilsson and on audio tapes recorded by Lennon. Several people close to Nilsson said they did not believe that he ever had the transcripts in his possession; others familiar with the journal and the tapes disputed the accuracy of Giuliano's interpretation. Writing in The Washington Post, David Segal described Giuliano's text as "a highly critical, luridly detailed account"; he quoted Giuliano's response when he was asked to corroborate his claim that Nilsson gave him the diaries: "It's obvious that I'm going to do things in an ethical manner." Steven Gutstein, a former New York assistant district attorney who read the diaries during an early 1980s larceny lawsuit, recalled that they contained "a lot of philosophical musings combined with mundane details of everyday life". Colin Carlson of Library Journal said of Lennon in America, "Non-fans will be put off by this image of Lennon as cad, drug addict, and paranoiac; this often sensationalized account is for voyeurs and fans with deconstructive tendencies and is one of the best, most detailed books available on this subject." Less impressed, a Publishers Weekly reviewer commented, "If Giuliano's own double-talk isn't enough to diminish this work's credibility, his endless, voyeuristic descriptions of Lennon's sexual encounters are."

In April 2009, The Daily Telegraph in London reported that Giuliano was instructing lawyers to file suit against Julia Baird, Lennon's half-sister and the co-author of his book John Lennon, My Brother. Giuliano maintained that Baird had based her 2007 book Imagine This, which was being adapted for screen as the Miramax film Nowhere Boy, on material he had gathered in their earlier collaboration. Giuliano stated that his lawsuit would request the recall and destruction of Baird's book, as well as a halt to the production of Nowhere Boy. The following month, Kevin Loader, the film's producer, commented on the story: "It's nothing to do with us. I haven't heard from anyone's lawyers."

In early 2010, Giuliano set about re-launching his literary career, founding Icon Editions to publish his extensive backlist and several new books authored with his middle daughter, Avalon Oneita Juliana. The author redesigned, updated and re-recorded his 200-plus audio books for download.

Selected bibliography
Dark Horse: The Private Life of George Harrison (1990)
Blackbird: The Life and Times of Paul McCartney (1991)
The Lost Beatles Interviews (1994)
Paint It Black: The Murder of Brian Jones (1994)
Behind Blue Eyes: The Life of Pete Townshend (1996)
Lennon in America: 1971–1980, Based in Part on the Lost Lennon Diaries (2000)

Films and other media 

Giuliano co-directed the DVD The Beatles: A Celebration. In 2005, he played a supporting role as pirate Captain Li in a made-for-television film that aired on the Hallmark Channel cable network called Mysterious Island. Since that time he has co-starred in Mechanic Resurrection, also in Scorpion King 3 and the costume drama Vikingdom. In August 2010, Guiliano was quoted by CNNGO.com as stating: "In Thailand, there are no more than perhaps five real professional (foreign) film actors, in a sea of aging psychotic steroid-junkie gym rats, towering old queens in love with Judy Garland, out-of-work English teachers who acted a bit in high school and other assorted human oddities."

On November 19, 2005, the film Stoned: The Wild & Wicked World of Brian Jones premiered in London. The film was "based on and inspired by" Guiliano's book Paint It Black: The Murder of Brian Jones, as well as Terry Rawlings' Who Killed Christopher Robin and Anna Wohlin's The Murder of Brian Jones.

As a singer-songwriter, Giuliano has released two CDs: Chocolate Wings (2001) and the Indo-fusion work God Dwells Within (2006).

In late 2005 Giuliano was hired by an American radio syndicator, Laurence Kahn of KGB Radio, to host a series of two-hour radio shows. Titled Geoffrey Giuliano's Roots of Rock, the shows aired on more than 60 stations in the United States and Canada. The program highlighted classic rock acts such as the Beatles, U2, and Jimi Hendrix.

In 2021, he portrayed VIP #4 in the Netflix series Squid Game.

Ronald McDonald and animal rights
Giuliano worked for an advertising agency, Vickers & Bensons in Toronto, Canada, portraying the McDonald's advertising figurehead Ronald McDonald for "basically a year and a half" for "The Ronald McDonald Safety Show". A statement, dated "Fall/Summer 1990", in which Giuliano decried "concerns who make their millions off the murder of countless animals and the exploitation of children for their own ends" was submitted on behalf of the plaintiffs in the 1991 "McLibel" case in London. Giuliano also played the Marvelous Magical Burger King for the Burger King Corporation.

Giuliano has been a vegetarian since 1970.

Criticism of the United States 

In 2019, Giuliano published to his YouTube channel a video titled "Why I Wont Live In America", in which he explains why he stopped living in the US about 25 years prior to the video. He explains what he believes to be the good things about the US, but also explains how the negative aspects of the country's history outweighed the good—being founded on the genocide of Native Americans, and that the US "has earned its reputation as an imperialistic, marauding power". He says the Constitution and Bill of Rights were good ideas, but then describes them as "all those lofty documents" written by slave owners. Giuliano also explains that "Thomas Jefferson had over 600 [slaves] at Monticello".

References

External links 
 

1953 births
American biographers
American male film actors
Hillsborough Community College alumni
Living people
American male biographers
Writers from Rochester, New York
People from Albion, Orleans County, New York
People from Niagara County, New York
State University of New York at Brockport alumni
Historians from New York (state)